Am Dobrock is a former Samtgemeinde ("collective municipality") in the district of Cuxhaven, in Lower Saxony, Germany. It is situated near the confluence of the rivers Oste and Elbe, approx. 25 km east of Cuxhaven, and 15 km south of Brunsbüttel. Its seat is in the village Cadenberge. On 1 November 2016 it was merged into the Samtgemeinde Land Hadeln.

The Samtgemeinde Am Dobrock consisted of the following municipalities:

 Belum
 Bülkau
 Cadenberge
 Geversdorf
 Neuhaus (Oste)
 Oberndorf
 Wingst

References

Cuxhaven (district)
Former Samtgemeinden in Lower Saxony